Adolf Ferdinand Sieverts (7 October 1874 – 8 January 1947) was a German chemist, best known for his work on solubility of gases in metals. He originated Sieverts's law. He was a doctoral student of Otto Wallach.

References

1854 births
1947 deaths
20th-century German chemists